Confusion Au Go Go is the final studio album by the rock band Love Battery. It was released in 1999 on C/Z Records.

Critical reception
AllMusic wrote: "The addition of Dan Peters (Mudhoney) on drums definitely tightens the screws, and the reinvigorated rhythm section provides the perfect foundation for guitarist Kevin Whitworth's inspired flights of fancy, including, as on Dayglo, some of the best slide guitar work in alternative rock." Martin C. Strong called Confusion Au Go Go "certainly a notable album," writing that "the band seemed to be in full swing and willing to push their boundaries."

Track listing 

 "Confusion Au Go Go" – 3:40
 "One Small Step" – 3:55
 "Snipe Hunt" – 3:18
 "Corporate Memo" – 3:26
 "Colorblind" – 3:12
 "Get on Da Big Foot" – 0:30
 "Dead Boys" – 4:10
 "Hollow Body" – 4:41
 "Cute One" – 2:45
 "Punks Want Rights" – 4:45
 "Transendental Fornication" – 4:52
 "Guilty of Everything" – 5:09
 "Monkey Brain" – 4:22
 "Faithfull" – 4:06

References

1999 albums
Love Battery albums